La Petite Rivière (English: Little River) is a tributary of the east bank of the Taschereau River (Bell River) flowing in the unorganized territory of Lac-Despinassy, in the Abitibi Regional County Municipality, in the administrative region of Abitibi-Témiscamingue, in Quebec, in Canada.

La Petite Rivière flows mainly in forest and marshland in the cantons of Ducros and Bartouille. Forestry is the main economic activity in this watershed. The river surface is usually frozen from mid-December to mid-April.

Geography 

The neighboring watersheds of La Petite Rivière are:
 north side: Taschereau River, Bell River;
 east side: Swanson stream, Bell river;
 south side: Ducros River, Peupliers River, Boucane River, Pascalis River, Tiblemont Lake, Courville River;
 west side: Taschereau river, Laflamme River.

La Petite Rivière has its source in the unorganized territory of Lac-Despinassy in a forest area with a few marshes.

The Petite Rivière flows onto the east bank of the Taschereau River. This confluence of La Petite Rivière is located at:
  south of the mouth of the Taschereau River;
  south-east of the railway;
  north-west of the mouth of Lake Parent;
  south of the village center of Lebel-sur-Quévillon;
  north of downtown Senneterre;

Toponymy 
In toponymy, the expression Petite Rivière is normally correlated with a larger river, in this case the Taschereau River.

The toponym La Petite Rivière was formalized on December 5, 1968 at the Commission de toponymie du Québec, that is when it was created.

Notes and references

Appendices

Related articles 
 James Bay
 Rupert Bay
 Nottaway River, a stream
 Matagami Lake, a body of water
 Bell River, a stream
 Taschereau River (Bell River tributary), a stream
 Lac-Despinassy, an Unorganized territory (Canada)
 Abitibi Regional County Municipality
 List of rivers of Quebec

External links 

Abitibi Regional County Municipality
Rivers of Abitibi-Témiscamingue